Mary Chase may refer to:

 Mary Chase (playwright) (1906–1981), American author of fourteen plays, including Harvey
 Mary Agnes Chase (1869–1963), American botanist
 Mary Ellen Chase (1887–1973), American educator, scholar and regional author
 Mary Catherine Chase (1835–?), American Catholic nun and writer

See also
 Chase (surname)
 Mary Chase Perry Stratton (1867–1961), American ceramic artist